Vulcanellidae is a family of sponges belonging to the order Tetractinellida.

Genera:
 Lamellomorpha Bergquist, 1968
 Poecillastra Sollas, 1888
 Vulcanella Sollas, 1886

References

Tetractinellida
Sponge families